Suriya Prasathinphimai (born April 2, 1980) is a Thai boxer who competed in the Middleweight (75 kg) at the 2004 Summer Olympics and won the bronze medal. He qualified for the 2004 Athens Games by ending up in second place in the 2nd AIBA Asian 2004 Olympic Qualifying Tournament in Karachi, Pakistan. In the final he lost to Pakistan's Ahmed Ali Khan.

He is the grandson of Sook Prasathinphimai, a legendary Muay Thai kickboxer in the 50s.

He also has a career in professional Muay Thai, under the name as "Suriya Sor Ploenchit" (สุริยา ส.เพลินจิต).

Biography

Professional career
On December 2, 2000, he fought against Masato from Japan in the memorial event of Thai King's Birthday. He won by the unanimous decision after 5th round and he also won the world title of IWM(International World Muaythai) at super welterweight.

On May 20, 2001, he fought against Hiroyuki Doi in Japan, and he won by the unanimous decision after 5th round. He knocked down Doi during 4th round with left cross, and Doi was docked one point when he threw Suriya during 5th round because Doi had been in the habit of throwing his opponents as he was a shoot boxer.

Winning Bronze medal at Olympic Games
On August 28, 2004, he won the bronze medal in middleweight (75 kg) at the 2004 Summer Olympics.

On March 4, 2004, Suriya participated "S-1 World Championship", the tournament of Muay Thai, at the Rajadamnern Stadium in Bangkok, Thailand. He fought against Jean Charles Skabowsky from France in the quarter final, but he was beaten by the unanimous decision after 3rd round.

In 2005 he competed for Thailand at the Boxing World Cup in Moscow, Russia, losing both his matches in the preliminary round. Prasathinphimai is also a professional kickboxer, the winner of World S-1 Kings Cup 2003 Tournament.

Replacing Kaoklai Kaennorsing, he challenged Simon Marcus for his WPMF World Light Heavyweight (-79 kg/175 lb) Championship at Muaythai Superfight in Pattaya, Thailand on June 14, 2013, and losing by unanimous decision.

Olympic results 
Defeated Joseph Lubega (Uganda) 30-21
Defeated Javid Taghiyev (Azerbaijan) 19-19, won decision
Defeated Oleg Mashkin (Ukraine) 28-22
Lost to Gaydarbek Gaydarbekov (Russia) 18-24

Muay Thai record

|-
|-  bgcolor="#FFBBBB"
| 2013-06-14 || Loss ||align=left| Simon Marcus || Muaythai Superfight || Pattaya, Thailand || Decision (unanimous) || 5 || 3:00
|-
! style=background:white colspan=9 |
|-
|-  bgcolor="#CCFFCC"
| 2013-03-23 || Win ||align=left| Marco Piqué || Thailand vs. Europe 2013 || Neu-Ulm, Germany || Decision (unanimous) || 5 || 3:00
|-
|-  bgcolor="#CCFFCC"
| 2012-03-16 || Win ||align=left| Chike Lindsay || San Wan Muaythai Naikhanomtom || Bangkok, Thailand || Decision || 5 || 3:00
|-
|-  bgcolor="#CCFFCC"
| 2012-02-27 || Win ||align=left| Youssef Boughanem || Europe vs. Thailand || Pattaya, France || Decision || 5 || 3:00 
|-
|-  bgcolor="#FFBBBB"
| 2004-03-04 || Loss ||align=left| Jean-Charles Skarbowsky || S1 World Championships, Quarter-final || Bangkok, Thailand || Decision (Unanimous) || 3 || 3:00 
|-  bgcolor="#CCFFCC"
| 2003-12-05 || Win ||align=left| Farid Villaume || King's Birthday event: S1 World Championships, Final || Sanam Luang, Thailand || Decision || 3 || 3:00 
|-
! style=background:white colspan=9 |
|-
|-  bgcolor="#CCFFCC"
| 2003-12-05 || Win ||align=left| Eh Phoutong || King's Birthday event: S1 World Championships, Semi-final || Sanam Luang, Thailand || Decision || 3 || 3:00
|-  bgcolor="#CCFFCC"
| 2003-12-05 || Win ||align=left| Arslan Magomedov || King's Birthday event: S1 World Championships, Quarter-final || Sanam Luang, Thailand || Decision || 3 || 3:00
|-  bgcolor="#FFBBBB"
| 2001-12-05 || Loss ||align=left| John Wayne Parr || King's Birthday event: Kings Cup Tournament Quarter-final || Sanam Luang, Thailand || Decision (Unanimous) || 3 || 3:00
|-  bgcolor="#CCFFCC"
| 2001-05-20 || Win ||align=left| Hiroyuki Doi || MAJKF "Searching For The Strongest! World Conquest" || Bunkyo, Tokyo, Japan || Decision (Unanimous) || 5 || 3:00
|-  bgcolor="#CCFFCC"
| 2000-12-02 || Win ||align=left| Masato || King's Birthday event || Sanam Luang, Thailand || Decision || 5 || 3:00
|-
! style=background:white colspan=9 |
|-  bgcolor="#cfc"
| 2000-10-14 || Win||align=left| Orono Por Muang Ubon || Lumpinee Stadium || Bangkok, Thailand || Decision  || 5 || 3:00
|-  bgcolor="#fbb"
| 1997-08-15 || Loss||align=left| Saifa Sor.Pannut || Lumpinee Stadium || Bangkok, Thailand || Decision  || 5 || 3:00
|-
| colspan=9 | Legend:

Titles
Amateur

2004 Summer Olympics Boxing Middleweight 3rd place
Professional
IWM World Super welterweight champion
S1 World Championship tournament winner

References

External links

Middleweight kickboxers
Suriya Prasathinphimai
Boxers at the 2004 Summer Olympics
Suriya Prasathinphimai
1980 births
Living people
Suriya Prasathinphimai
Olympic medalists in boxing
Asian Games medalists in boxing
Boxers at the 2002 Asian Games
Boxers at the 2006 Asian Games
Boxers at the 2010 Asian Games
Medalists at the 2004 Summer Olympics
Suriya Prasathinphimai
Suriya Prasathinphimai
Suriya Prasathinphimai
Medalists at the 2002 Asian Games
Southeast Asian Games medalists in boxing
Suriya Prasathinphimai
Competitors at the 2005 Southeast Asian Games
Middleweight boxers
Suriya Prasathinphimai